The 1914–15 Harvard Crimson men's ice hockey season was the 18th season of play for the program.

Season
With Hobey Baker now graduated, there was an open question as to which was the leading team in college hockey. After a subpar end to their season, Harvard had ample reason to reclaim the intercollegiate championship.

The Crimson began the year with a convincing 6–2 win over MIT, scoring the first six goals and using the remainder of the game to ease their alternates into game action. The team lost a match against the Boston Athletic Association before pausing for the winter break. 

Harvard lost their first game back but recovered a few days later with a dominant performance against Cornell. The first big test for the team was against defending champion Princeton, but the Tigers were missing far too many players from the previous year to put up much of a fight. With Harvard sailing towards a championship they were shocked in their very next game by Dartmouth. Without a second game against the Greens, Harvard could only hope that Dartmouth would lose to keep the championship dreams alive.

A sterling performance from Wylde allowed Harvard to complete the season sweep of Princeton. A week later the Elis came to town and Harvard once more proved the better team. After a shutout of Mass. Agg. Harvard was stymied by McGill, as they had been the year before, but the ensuing 9–1 win over Williams demonstrated that the Crimson was still atop their game.

Harvard has an eleven day layoff leading to their rematch with Yale, and the game could scarce have meant more. Harvard was one win away from the IHL championship and, because of the Bulldogs' win over Dartmouth at the beginning of the month, the Crimson could finish with a 3-way split for the collegiate championship as well. Harvard's defense proved stout once more as the Crimson skated to a 3–1 win capturing the season series.

With Harvard, Dartmouth and Yale having defeated one another during the season, none had a solid claim for the Intercollegiate championship. A playoff was suggested to determine the sole champion between the three, however, Harvard disbanded their team shortly after defeating Yale with the expectation that the team would claim the championship.

Roster

Standings

Schedule and Results

|-
!colspan=12 style=";" | Regular Season

References

Harvard Crimson men's ice hockey seasons
Harvard
Harvard
Harvard
Harvard
Harvard